(born May 8, 1975) is a Japanese mixed martial artist and professional wrestler. He is the Co-Champion of the UFC 41 Lightweight Tournament and a former Shooto Lightweight Champion. As one of the early Ultimate Fighting Championship's elite Lightweight competitors, Uno competed for the UFC Lightweight Championship on two occasions. Despite falling short in both championship bouts; losing a five-round decision against Jens Pulver at UFC 30, to determine the inaugural UFC Lightweight Champion as well as a draw against B.J. Penn at UFC 41 (in a bout which would have determined the new UFC Lightweight Champion and UFC 41 Lightweight Tournament Winner), Uno is acknowledged as a pioneer for his impact and influence during the early era of the UFC Lightweight Division.

Mixed martial arts career

Early career
Uno finished second in the All Japan amateur Shooto tournament in 1996.  He was a runner-up in the submission wrestling world championships at ADCC losing in the finals to world-renowned Jean Jacques Machado.

Shooto
Uno rose through the ranks of the Shooto mixed martial arts organization in Japan. In May 1999, Uno fought the then-legendary Rumina Sato. The fight was hailed as "Fight of the Year", an extremely fast-paced back and forth battle with a wide variety of stand-up and grappling exchanges. Eventually, Uno took the back of Sato and choked him into submission.

The two rematched in December 2000. This fight concluded with Uno standing over Sato on his back, then striking him with a knee and a punch while he was getting up, knocking him out.

UFC
After his second victory over Rumina Sato, Uno was recruited to fight for the UFC's Bantamweight (later renamed Lightweight) title against Jens Pulver. Throughout the fight, Pulver stopped Uno's takedown attempts and pressed the action on the feet. Uno, who had earned a reputation as being "unflappable", began to show frustration for the first time in his career as Pulver neutralized all his offensive efforts. Pulver took a majority decision win in the fight.

After Pulver left the UFC, the Lightweight Championship was vacated. A tournament was put together pitting the top Lightweights in the UFC (B.J. Penn, Din Thomas, Matt Serra and Caol Uno). In the first round, Uno faced Thomas. Thomas dominated the first round, setting a high pace. However, Uno turned things around, taking the second and third rounds to win the fight.

In the finals of the tournament, Uno faced Penn (who had previously defeated Uno by knockout in under 12 seconds). Uno used angles and effective wrestling techniques to frustrate Penn, who appeared tentative from the start, while Penn was dominant in spurts. The fight was called a draw and neither fighter won the championship belt.

Return to Japan
Uno then went on to fight Tatsuya Kawajiri in Shooto before fighting at K-1's 2004 Premium Dynamite!! and K-1 MAX: Japan Grand Prix 2005. His next eleven fights were for the then newly established promotion Hero's.

Uno next competed in DREAM's Lightweight Grand Prix. He was seeded directly into the second round, DREAM 3, where he beat Mitsuhiro Ishida via rear-naked choke submission to progress to the Dream 5: Lightweight Grand Prix 2008 Final Round. At Dream 5, Uno lost a unanimous decision to Shinya Aoki.

UFC return
Uno was spotted in attendance at UFC 94, fueling talk of a return to the UFC's Lightweight division. It was later confirmed that Uno had signed with the UFC and would face Spencer Fisher at UFC 99: The Comeback. In spite of finishing the bout pounding Fisher with punches from top crucifix position, Uno lost by a controversial unanimous decision. Then, on November 21, 2009, Uno fought UFC newcomer Fabrício Camões to a majority draw at UFC 106.

On March 31, 2010, Uno fought Gleison Tibau at UFC Fight Night 21. He was overpowered by the much bigger Tibau, and suffered a loss via TKO (punches). After the fight he was released from the promotion.

Post-UFC career
Uno fought Jesse Brock at Vale Tudo Japan: VTJ 4th, on February 23, 2014. He won via unanimous decision.

Professional wrestling career
Uno debuted in professional wrestling in December 2000 as part of the Inoki Bom-Ba-Ye event. He teamed up with Akira Shoji against The Great Sasuke and Daijiro Matsui, but his team lost when Sasuke pinned him.

All Japan Pro Wrestling (2002-2003)
Uno then signed up with All Japan Pro Wrestling in June 2002, where he debuted as a partner for Kendo Kashin against Kaz Hayashi and Kashin's double Mr. Problem (played again by Matsui), albeit in another losing effort. In November, he became also part of the event Wrestle-1, co-promoted with K-1. Coming under a monkey mask (which he quickly lost) and the name "The Apeman Nigo", Uno teamed up with Kashin to defeat La Parka and Super Parka.

He returned to AJPW in May 2003 under his Apeman Nigo persona. He and Kaz Hayashi lost to Kashin and Low Ki, but at the next event he teamed up with Ki to beat Gran Naniwa and Ryuji Hijikata. At the next day, he competed under his true name with Keiji Mutoh, winning over 728% Machine and The Apeman 200%, and then recovered his Nigo mask to team with Mutoh and Taka Michinoku in a winning effort against The Great Sasuke, The Great Kosuke and The Apeman. Uno's last appearance for AJPW would be in July, allying with Kashin and Robbie Brookside to beat Hayashi, Jimmy Yang and Ebessan.

Championships and accomplishments

Mixed martial arts
All Japan Amateur Shooto
All Japan Amateur Shooto Tournament Runner-up (1996)
Ultimate Fighting Championship
UFC 41 Lightweight Tournament Co-Champion (drew with B.J. Penn in the finale)
Shooto
Shooto Lightweight Championship (One Time)
One successful title defense vs. Rumina Sato
K-1 Hero's
2007 K-1 HERO'S Lightweight Tournament Semifinalist
2006 K-1 HERO'S Lightweight Tournament Runner Up
2005 K-1 HERO'S Lightweight Tournament Semifinalist
DREAM
2008 DREAM Lightweight Grand Prix Semifinalist

Submission wrestling
ADCC Submission Wrestling World Championship
ADCC Submission Wrestling World Championship Silver Medalist 66k-76k (1999)

Mixed martial arts record 

|-
| Loss
| align=center| 34–22–5
| Akira Haraguchi
| Decision (unanimous)
| VTJ 2021
| 
| align=center| 3
| align=center| 5:00
| Tokyo, Japan
|
|-
| Loss
| align=center| 34–21–5
| Taison Naito
| KO (punch)
| Shooto – Professional Shooto 2021 Vol. 3
| 
| align=center| 2
| align=center| 4:59
| Tokyo, Japan
|
|-
| Win
| align=center| 34–20–5
| Markus Held
| Submission (rear-naked choke)
| Shooto 30th Anniversary Tour: Final
| 
| align=center| 2
| align=center| 1:56
| Tokyo, Japan
|
|-
| Loss
| align=center| 33–20–5
| Duane van Helvoirt
| Decision (unanimous)
| Shooto 30th Anniversary Tour at Korakuen Hall
| 
| align=center| 3
| align=center| 5:00
| Tokyo, Japan
|
|-
| Loss
| align=center| 33–19–5
| Yutaka Saito
| Decision (unanimous)
| Shooto: Professional Shooto 4/23	
| 
| align=center| 5
| align=center| 5:00
| Chiba, Japan
|
|-
| Win
| align=center| 33–18–5
| Jung Ho Hwang
| Submission (rear-naked choke)
| Shooto-Mobstyles: Fight and Mosh
| 
| align=center| 2
| align=center| 0:31
| Chiba, Japan
|
|-
| Loss
| align=center| 32–18–5
| Shigeki Osawa
| TKO (punches)
| Shooto: Professional Shooto 7/26
| 
| align=center| 2
| align=center| 4:03
| Tokyo, Japan
|
|-
| Loss
| align=center| 32–17–5
| Yoshifumi Nakamura
| Decision (unanimous)
| Shooto - 1st Round 2015
| 
| align=center| 3
| align=center| 5:00
| Tokyo, Japan
| 
|-
| Win
| align=center| 32–16–5
| Raja Shippen
| Submission (rear-naked choke)
| Vale Tudo Japan: VTJ 6th
| 
| align=center| 2
| align=center| 4:33
| Tokyo, Japan
|
|-
| Win
| align=center| 31–16–5
| Taiki Tsuchiya
| Decision (unanimous)
| Shooto: 4th Round 2014
| 
| align=center| 3
| align=center| 5:00
| Tokyo, Japan
|
|-
| Win
| align=center| 30–16–5
| Jesse Brock
| Decision (unanimous)
| Vale Tudo Japan: VTJ 4th
| 
| align=center| 3
| align=center| 5:00
| Tokyo, Japan
|
|-
| Win
| align=center| 29–16–5
| Daniel Romero
| Submission (inverted triangle choke)
| Vale Tudo Japan: VTJ 3rd
| 
| align=center| 2
| align=center| 2:23
| Tokyo, Japan
| 
|-
| Win
| align=center| 28–16–5
| Anthony Avila
| Submission (rear-naked choke)
| Vale Tudo Japan: VTJ 2nd
| 
| align=center| 3
| align=center| 1:53
| Tokyo, Japan
| 
|-
| Win
| align=center| 27–16–5
| Kyu Hwa Kim
| Submission (rear-naked choke)
| Shooto: 2nd Round 2013
| 
| align=center| 1
| align=center| 4:10
| Tokyo, Japan
| 
|-
| Loss
| align=center| 26–16–5
| Shintaro Ishiwatari
| Decision (unanimous)
| Shooto: 10th Round
| 
| align=center| 3
| align=center| 5:00
| Tokyo, Japan
| 
|-
| Loss
| align=center| 26–15–5
| Takeshi Inoue
| KO (head kick)
| DREAM 17
| 
| align=center| 1
| align=center| 4:17
| Saitama, Saitama, Japan
| 
|-
| Win
| align=center| 26–14–5
| Akiyo Nishiura
| Decision (unanimous)
| Dream: Fight for Japan!
| 
| align=center| 2
| align=center| 5:00
| Saitama, Saitama, Japan
| 
|-
| Loss
| align=center| 25–14–5
| Kazuyuki Miyata
| Decision (unanimous)
| Dynamite!! 2010
| 
| align=center| 3
| align=center| 5:00
| Saitama, Saitama, Japan
| 
|-
| Loss
| align=center| 25–13–5
| Gleison Tibau
| TKO (punches)
| UFC Fight Night: Florian vs. Gomi
| 
| align=center| 1
| align=center| 4:13
| Charlotte, North Carolina, United States
| 
|-
| Draw
| align=center| 25–12–5
| Fabrício Camões
| Draw (majority)
| UFC 106
| 
| align=center| 3
| align=center| 5:00
| Las Vegas, Nevada, United States
| 
|-
| Loss
| align=center| 25–12–4
| Spencer Fisher
| Decision (unanimous)
| UFC 99
| 
| align=center| 3
| align=center| 5:00
| Cologne, Germany
| 
|-
| Loss
| align=center| 25–11–4
| Shinya Aoki
| Decision (unanimous)
| Dream 5: Lightweight Grand Prix 2008 Final Round
| 
| align=center| 2
| align=center| 5:00
| Osaka, Japan
| 
|-
| Win
| align=center| 
| Mitsuhiro Ishida
| Submission (rear-naked choke)
| Dream 3: Lightweight Grand Prix 2008 Second Round
| 
| align=center| 2
| align=center| 1:39
| Saitama, Saitama, Japan
| 
|-
| Loss
| align=center| 24–10–4
| Andre Amade
| Decision (unanimous)
| HERO'S 10
| 
| align=center| 3
| align=center| 5:00
| Yokohama, Japan
| 
|-
| Win
| align=center| 24–9–4
| Katsuhiko Nagata
| Decision (unanimous)
| HERO'S 9
| 
| align=center| 3
| align=center| 5:00
| Yokohama, Japan
| 
|-
| Win
| align=center| 23–9–4
| Ali Abdelaziz
| Submission (armbar)
| HERO'S 8
| 
| align=center| 1
| align=center| 1:58
| Nagoya, Japan
| 
|-
| Loss
| align=center| 22–9–4
| Gesias Cavalcante
| Decision (majority)
| HERO'S 7
| 
| align=center| 2
| align=center| 5:00
| Yokohama, Japan
| 
|-
| Win
| align=center| 22–8–4
| Ivan Menjivar
| Decision (unanimous)
| HERO'S 7
| 
| align=center| 2
| align=center| 5:00
| Yokohama, Japan
| 
|-
| Win
| align=center| 21–8–4
| Kultar Gill
| Submission (rear-naked choke)
| HERO'S 6
| 
| align=center| 2
| align=center| 3:30
| Tokyo, Japan
| 
|-
| Win
| align=center| 20–8–4
| Ole Laursen
| Submission (rear-naked choke)
| HERO'S 5
| 
| align=center| 2
| align=center| 4:36
| Tokyo, Japan
| 
|-
| Win
| align=center| 19–8–4
| Rich Clementi
| Decision (unanimous)
| HERO'S 4
| 
| align=center| 2
| align=center| 5:00
| Tokyo, Japan
| 
|-
| Loss
| align=center| 18–8–4
| Norifumi Yamamoto
| TKO (doctor stoppage)
| HERO'S 3
| 
| align=center| 2
| align=center| 4:04
| Tokyo, Japan
| 
|-
| Win
| align=center| 18–7–4
| Hideo Tokoro
| Decision (unanimous)
| HERO'S 3
| 
| align=center| 2
| align=center| 5:00
| Tokyo, Japan
| 
|-
| Loss
| align=center| 17–7–4
| Joachim Hansen
| KO (knee)
| HERO'S 1
| 
| align=center| 3
| align=center| 4:48
| Saitama, Japan
| 
|-
| Win
| align=center| 17–6–4
| Serkan Yilmaz
| Submission (armbar)
| K-1 MAX: Japan Grand Prix 2005
| 
| align=center| 1
| align=center| 1:59
| Tokyo, Japan
| 
|-
| Win
| align=center| 16–6–4
| Chandet Sorpantrey
| Submission (rear-naked choke)
| K-1: Premium 2004 Dynamite!!
| 
| align=center| 2
| align=center| 0:19
| Osaka, Japan
| 
|-
| Draw
| align=center| 15–6–4
| Tatsuya Kawajiri
| Draw
| Shooto: 3/22 in Korakuen Hall
| 
| align=center| 3
| align=center| 5:00
| Tokyo, Japan
| 
|-
| Loss
| align=center| 15–6–3
| Hermes França
| KO (punch)
| UFC 44
| 
| align=center| 2
| align=center| 2:46
| Las Vegas, Nevada, United States
| 
|-
| Draw
| align=center| 15–5–3
| B.J. Penn
| Draw (split)
| UFC 41
| 
| align=center| 5
| align=center| 5:00
| Atlantic City, New Jersey, United States
| 
|-
| Win
| align=center| 15–5–2
| Din Thomas
| Decision (unanimous)
| UFC 39
| 
| align=center| 3
| align=center| 5:00
| Uncasville, Connecticut, United States
| 
|-
| Win
| align=center| 14–5–2
| Yves Edwards
| Decision (unanimous)
| UFC 37
| 
| align=center| 3
| align=center| 5:00
| Bossier City, Louisiana, United States
| 
|-
| Loss
| align=center| 13–5–2
| B.J. Penn
| KO (punches)
| UFC 34
| 
| align=center| 1
| align=center| 0:11
| Las Vegas, Nevada, United States
| 
|-
| Win
| align=center| 13–4–2
| Fabiano Iha
| TKO (punches)
| UFC 32
| 
| align=center| 1
| align=center| 1:48
| East Rutherford, New Jersey, United States
| 
|-
| Loss
| align=center| 12–4–2
| Jens Pulver
| Decision (unanimous)
| UFC 30
| 
| align=center| 5
| align=center| 5:00
| Atlantic City, New Jersey, United States
| 
|-
| Win
| align=center| 12–3–2
| Rumina Sato
| KO (punch)
| Shooto: R.E.A.D. Final
| 
| align=center| 1
| align=center| 2:21
| Chiba, Chiba, Japan
| 
|-
| Loss
| align=center| 11–3–2
| Marcio Barbosa
| Technical Submission (guillotine choke)
| Shooto: R.E.A.D. 9
| 
| align=center| 3
| align=center| 1:49
| Yokohama, Japan
| 
|-
| Win
| align=center| 11–2–2
| Dennis Hallman
| Decision (unanimous)
| Shooto: R.E.A.D. 3
| 
| align=center| 3
| align=center| 5:00
| Osaka, Japan
| 
|-
| Draw
| align=center| 10–2–2
| André Pederneiras
| Draw
| Vale Tudo Japan 1999
| 
| align=center| 3
| align=center| 8:00
| Tokyo, Japan
| 
|-
| Win
| align=center| 10–2–1
| Din Thomas
| Submission (rear-naked choke)
| Shooto: Renaxis 4
| 
| align=center| 3
| align=center| 3:16
| Tokyo, Japan
| 
|-
| Win
| align=center| 9–2–1
| Rumina Sato
| Submission (rear-naked choke)
| Shooto: 10th Anniversary Event
| 
| align=center| 3
| align=center| 4:02
| Yokohama, Japan
| 
|-
| Win
| align=center| 8–2–1
| Ricardo Botelho
| Submission (punches)
| Vale Tudo Japan 1998
| 
| align=center| 3
| align=center| 2:03
| Tokyo, Japan
| 
|-
| Win
| align=center| 7–2–1
| Zvonko Jakovcevic
| Submission (triangle choke)
| Shooto: Las Grandes Viajes 4
| 
| align=center| 1
| align=center| 3:15
| Tokyo, Japan
| 
|-
| Win
| align=center| 6–2–1
| Ian James Schaffa
| Technical Submission (armbar)
| Shooto: Las Grandes Viajes 3
| 
| align=center| 3
| align=center| 3:13
| Tokyo, Japan
| 
|-
| Win
| align=center| 5–2–1
| Yuji Fujita
| Decision (unanimous)
| Shooto: Las Grandes Viajes 2
| 
| align=center| 2
| align=center| 5:00
| Tokyo, Japan
| 
|-
| Loss
| align=center| 4–2–1
| Naoya Uematsu
| Submission (Achilles lock)
| Lumax Cup: Tournament of J '97 Lightweight Tournament
| 
| align=center| 1
| align=center| 0:23
| Japan
| 
|-
| Win
| align=center| 4–1–1
| Hiroki Kotani
| Decision (unanimous)
| Lumax Cup: Tournament of J '97 Lightweight Tournament
| 
| align=center| 2
| align=center| 3:00
| Japan
| 
|-
| Win
| align=center| 3–1–1
| Masahito Wachi
| Decision (unanimous)
| Lumax Cup: Tournament of J '97 Lightweight Tournament
| 
| align=center| 2
| align=center| 3:00
| Japan
| 
|-
| Draw
| align=center| 2–1–1
| Takuya Kuwabara
| Draw
| Shooto: Reconquista 4
| 
| align=center| 2
| align=center| 5:00
| Tokyo, Japan
| 
|-
| Win
| align=center| 2–1
| Yuzo Tateishi
| Submission (rear-naked choke)
| Shooto: Gig
| 
| align=center| 1
| align=center| 2:14
| Tokyo, Japan
| 
|-
| Win
| align=center| 1–1
| Patrick Tapels
| Submission (rear-naked choke)
| Japan Extreme Challenge Vale Tudo Open
| 
| align=center| 1
| align=center| 2:20
| Tokyo, Japan
| 
|-
| Loss
| align=center| 0–1
| Hayato Sakurai
| Submission (armbar)
| Shooto: Let's Get Lost
| 
| align=center| 1
| align=center| 2:52
| Tokyo, Japan
|

Submission grappling record
KO PUNCHES
|- style="text-align:center; background:#f0f0f0;"
| style="border-style:none none solid solid; "|Result
| style="border-style:none none solid solid; "|Opponent
| style="border-style:none none solid solid; "|Method
| style="border-style:none none solid solid; "|Event
| style="border-style:none none solid solid; "|Date
| style="border-style:none none solid solid; "|Round
| style="border-style:none none solid solid; "|Time
| style="border-style:none none solid solid; "|Notes
|-
|Win|| Leigh Remedios || Submission (straight armlock) || Polaris 10 || May 25, 2019|| 1|| 5:10||
|-
|Loss|| Marcos de Souza || Submission (armbar) || Quintet || April 11, 2018|| 1|| ||
|-
|Loss|| Fredson Paixao || Submission (armbar) || UFC Fan Expo|| 2010|| 2|| 3:15||
|-
|Win|| Javier Vazquez || Decision || CAND|| 2004|| 3|| ||
|-
|Loss|| Minoru Suzuki and  Tsuyoshi Kohsaka || Submission || The Contenders X-Rage Vol.2|| October 3, 2002|| 1|| 14:39||Partnered with  Osami Shibuya
|-
|Draw|| Minoru Suzuki and  Takafumi Ito || Draw || The Contenders 5 Prospective M-1|| October 6, 2001|| 1|| 10:00||Partnered with  Daiju Takase
|-
|Loss|| Fernando Vasconcelos || Points || ADCC 2001 Absolute|| 2001|| || ||
|-
|Loss|| Takanori Gomi || Decision || The CONTENDERS 6||October 8, 2001|| 3|| ||
|-
|Win|| Yasushi Miyake || Decision || The CONTENDERS 4|| 2000|| || ||
|-
|Loss|| Genki Sudo || Decision || The CONTENDERS 2000|| 2000|| 2|| ||
|-
|Loss|| Marcio Feitosa Souza || Points || ADCC 2000 –77 kg|| 2000|| 1|| ||
|-
|Loss|| Jean-Jacques Machado || Submission (rear naked choke) || ADCC 1999 –77 kg|| 1999|| 1|| 4:45||
|-
|Win|| Eddie Ruiz || Submission || ADCC 1999 –77 kg|| 1999|| 1|| 6:00||
|-
|Win|| Pedro Duarte || Decision || ADCC 1999 –77 kg|| 1999|| 3|| 20:00||
|-
|Win|| John Lewis || Submission (rear naked choke) || ADCC 1999 –77 kg|| 1999|| 1|| 8:05||
|-
|Draw|| Yasushi Miyake || - || The CONTENDERS 1|| 1999|| 3|| ||
|-

See also 
List of male mixed martial artists
List of Shooto champions
List of Brazilian jiu-jitsu practitioners

References

External links 
 Official Fight Team
 
 
 

1975 births
Living people
Japanese male mixed martial artists
Lightweight mixed martial artists
Mixed martial artists utilizing shoot wrestling
Mixed martial artists utilizing catch wrestling
Mixed martial artists utilizing judo
Mixed martial artists utilizing Brazilian jiu-jitsu
Japanese submission wrestlers
Japanese catch wrestlers
Wajitsu Keishukai
Japanese male professional wrestlers
Japanese practitioners of Brazilian jiu-jitsu
People awarded a black belt in Brazilian jiu-jitsu
Japanese male judoka
People from Yokosuka, Kanagawa
Ultimate Fighting Championship male fighters